Jens Ludwig (born 30 August 1977) is the lead guitarist and co-founder
of the German power metal band Edguy. Jens has played nearly all the band's lead parts and guitar solos since their inception and is the only member of the current line-up other than Tobias Sammet to have any songwriting credits.  He also contributed lead guitar work for Sammet's Avantasia side project, on both The Metal Opera and The Metal Opera Part II.  In 2021, Ludwig and vocalist Nando Fernandes formed a new band, The Grandmaster. He has an endorsement with Gibson guitars, Marshall  amplifiers, Ernie Ball - Strings Music Man (company), Vox (musical equipment) Amps, Shure mics & wireless equipment, Kemper Profiling Amps and others.

Discography

Edguy

Avantasia
 The Metal Opera (2001)
 The Metal Opera Part II (2002)

Morrigan

 Forgoden Art (1999)

The Grandmaster

 Skywards (2021)

References

External links
 Official Edguy website

Living people
1977 births
German heavy metal guitarists
Lead guitarists
German male guitarists
Edguy members
21st-century guitarists
21st-century German male musicians